Little Budworth is a civil parish in Cheshire West and Chester, England. It contains 18 buildings that are recorded in the National Heritage List for England as designated listed buildings. Of these, four are listed at Grade II*, and the others at Grade II. Other than the village of Little Budworth, the parish is completely rural, and this is reflected in its listed buildings. These are all domestic or related to farming, other than the village church, a memorial, the entrance gates to the former Oulton Park House, a pinfold, and the plague stone.

Key

Buildings

See also
Listed buildings in Darnhall
Listed buildings in Delamere
Listed buildings in Rushton
Listed buildings in Utkinton

Listed buildings in Whitegate and Marton
Listed buildings in Winsford

References
Citations

Sources

Listed buildings in Cheshire West and Chester
Lists of listed buildings in Cheshire